My Dog, Buddy is a 1960 American adventure film directed by Ray Kellogg, and starring Travis Lemmond, Ken Curtis, Ken Knox, James H. Foster, Jane Murchison, Bob Thompson, Jo Palmie, Judge Henry Dupree, and Charles P. Eisenmann. The film was released by Columbia Pictures on August 1960.

Cast
 Travis Lemmond as Ted Dodd
 Ken Curtis as Dr. Lusk
 Ken Knox as Dr. White
 James H. Foster as Jim Foster
 Jane Murchison as Jane Foster
 Bob Thompson as Salizar
 Jo Palmie as Nurse Lewis
 Judge Henry Dupree as Special Detective
 Charles P. Eisenmann as Patrol Officer
 Gerry Johnson as Elizabeth Lynch
 Don Keyes as George Lynch
 William T. Babb as Fireman
 Desmond Dhooge as Kolinzky
 London the Dog as Buddy
 Bob Euler as Artist Fuller
 Honest Joe as Junkyard Owner
 C.B. Lemmond as Mr. Dodd
 Lilla Lemmond as Mrs. Dodd
 Bart McLendon as Junior Lynch
Morris Mewbourn as Davis
 Angus G. Wynne III as Press Photographer (uncredited)

References

External links
 

1960s children's adventure films
1960s adventure drama films
American adventure drama films
American children's adventure films
American children's drama films
1960 films
Columbia Pictures films
Films scored by Jack Marshall
1960 drama films
1960s English-language films
1960s American films